Buoys is the sixth studio album by American musician Panda Bear, released on February 8, 2019. It was preceded by the lead single "Dolphin", released along with its music video, and features collaborations with Chilean DJ Lizz and Portuguese singer Dino D'Santiago.

Recording
The album was co-produced by Panda Bear (Noah Lennox) with Rusty Santos in Lisbon, Portugal, where Lennox now lives. The last record the two worked on was Lennox's 2007 album Person Pitch. Lennox also stated that he wanted to create music that would "feel familiar to a young person's ears", so worked with Santos to utilize production techniques of current music. Rolling Stone stated that the sound of the record is different from Lennox's previous material and evident on "Dolphin", which contains a "single guitar, a faint bassline and some textured samples" around Lennox's vocals. Lennox himself called the album the "beginning of something new".

Track listing

Charts

References

2019 albums
Panda Bear (musician) albums
Domino Recording Company albums